In mathematics, two metrics on the same underlying set are said to be equivalent if the resulting metric spaces share certain properties.  Equivalence is a weaker notion than isometry; equivalent metrics do not have to be literally the same.  Instead, it is one of several ways of generalizing equivalence of norms to general metric spaces.

Topological equivalence
The adverb topologically is often dropped. There are multiple ways of expressing this condition:
 a subset  is -open if and only if it is -open;
 the open balls "nest": for any point  and any radius , there exist radii  such that 
 the identity function  is continuous with continuous inverse; that is, it is a homeomorphism.

The following are sufficient but not necessary conditions for topological equivalence:
 there exists a strictly increasing, continuous, and subadditive  such that .
 for each , there exist positive constants  and  such that, for every point ,

Strong equivalence

Strong equivalence of two metrics implies topological equivalence, but not vice versa. In fact, this interval is bounded under one of these metrics but not the other. On the other hand, strong equivalences always take bounded sets to bounded sets.

Relation with equivalence of norms 

For linear operators between normed vector spaces, Lipschitz continuity is equivalent to continuity—an operator satisfying either of these conditions is called bounded.

In finite dimensional vector spaces, all metrics induced by a norm, including the euclidean metric, the taxicab metric, and the Chebyshev distance, are equivalent.

Properties preserved by equivalence
 The continuity of a function is preserved if either the domain or range is remetrized by an equivalent metric, but uniform continuity is preserved only by strongly equivalent metrics.
 The differentiability of a function , for  a normed space and  a subset of a normed space, is preserved if either the domain or range is renormed by a strongly equivalent norm.
 A metric that is strongly equivalent to a complete metric is also complete; the same is not true of equivalent metrics because homeomorphisms do not preserve completeness. (It is not Cauchy in the induced metric.)

Notes

References

 
 
 
 

Metric geometry
Equivalence (mathematics)